Thunder Run may refer to:

 Thunder Run (film), a 1986 American action-thriller film
 Thunder Run (Canada's Wonderland), a roller coaster at Canada's Wonderland
 Thunder Run (Kentucky Kingdom), a wooden roller coaster at Kentucky Kingdom
 Thunder Runs, a series of raids in the 2003 Battle of Baghdad
 "Thunder Run", a 2020 novel Daniel José Older